Railway workshops are railway facilities in which rolling stock is repaired. While often colocated with engine sheds to perform routine tasks as well as major repairs, in some countries separated concepts exist with railway workshops being specialized in major repairs and general inspections.

In German-speaking countries, the generic names Werkstatt, or specifically in Austria Hauptwerkstatt, are commonly used, except for Germany, where railway workshops maintained by Deutsche Bahn are called Ausbesserungswerk or simply Werk.

List of railway workshops
Australia 
Eveleigh Railway Workshops
Midland Railway Workshops
Newport Workshops
India
Jamalpur Locomotive Workshop
New Zealand
Addington Workshops
East Town Workshops
Hillside Engineering 
Hutt Workshops 
Newmarket Workshops
Otahuhu Workshops 
Petone Workshops
Germany
see Ausbesserungswerk

See also
Conservation and restoration of rail vehicles
Motive power depot